Hamburg Südamerikanische Dampfschifffahrts-Gesellschaft A/S & Co KG, widely known as Hamburg Süd, was a German container shipping company. Founded in 1871, Hamburg Süd was among the market leaders in the North–South trade. It also served all significant East–West trade lanes.

The shipping entity was formerly part of the Oetker Group, but was sold to A.P. Moller–Maersk Group's shipping division Maersk Line in 2017.

Since 2023, the Mark Livery and the red colour will not be used anymore, all goes under Maersk presentation presence.

History
In 1871, Hamburg Südamerikanische Dampfschifffahrts-Gesellschaft  (Hamburg–South America Steam Shipping Company, or Hamburg South America Line) was established by a conglomerate of 11 Hamburg-based merchant houses. Three steam-ships totalling 4,000 GRT provided a monthly shipping service to Brazil and Argentina.

By 1914, the company was operating over 50 ships totaling approximately 325,000 GRT. World War I culminated in the loss of all Hamburg Süd's vessels, and the company was forced to begin again by chartering vessels.

The early 1950s saw the company embark on tramp shipping and tanker shipping, and caused the large growth of refrigerated cargo. In 1955, the Dr. August Oetker company took over the entity, and began rapid expansion on its liner and passenger services.

The takeover of Deutsche Levante Linie in 1956 saw the company commence its first foray into the Mediterranean. In 1957, liner services began between North America and Australia/New Zealand, with the Columbus New Zealand being the first container ship to ply trade lanes in the region in 1971, pioneering containerization in the Pacific.

Wartime roles 
 The Cap Trafalgar was a brand-new passenger liner, having been completed only on March 1, 1914 and had commenced her maiden voyage only on March 10, 1914. Germany had lightly armed the vessel with two 10.5 cm guns and 6 heavy machine guns, and had removed one of the three steam-funnels and re-coloured the vessel to disguise it as a British liner. The vessel encountered the British fully armed ex-steam liner RMS Carmania about 700 miles east of the Brazilian coast, near the island of Trindade, at 9:30  a.m. on September 14, 1914. After a heated exchange of fire between the two ships, the Cap Trafalgar began listing to the left, then sank bow-first.
 The Cap Arcona, arguably one of the most beautiful passenger liners in its time, was converted to serve the Kriegsmarine (German Navy) as a converted transport vessel in 1940. At the end of 1944 it was commandeered as a troopship, primarily transporting refugees and prisoners of war on the Baltic Sea. Loaded with 4,500 prisoners at Lübeck Bay, it was attacked and sunk by Royal Air Force Typhoons in an air-raid. It remained capsized in Lübeck Bay until 1950 and was then dismantled by divers over a period of several years and scrapped. The wreckage was registered and photographed in detail by Rolls-Royce, which had produced the RAF's rockets, to assess their effectiveness.

Corporate takeovers

Hamburg Süd also owns Brazilian operator Aliança. It has taken over many companies over the years including Ellerman, Kien Hung, South Seas Steamship, Deutsche-Nah-Ost-Linie, Royal Mail Line, Pacific Steam Navigation Company, Swedish Laser Lines, Rotterdam Zuid-America Lijn (RZAL), Havenlijn and the Inter-America services of Crowley American Transport, and in 2015 the Chilean CCNI.

In the past parts of Hamburg Süd have been known as Columbus Line. Since 2004, the services of Columbus Line are directly integrated into Hamburg-Süd.

The current container fleet of dry boxes has a distinctive red color with a huge flag and white HAMBURG SÜD logo on the side.
The refrigerated boxes are white with the flag and navy blue lettering.

Humanitarian aid

Hamburg Süd supports international aid organisations with in-house shipping facilities. In the shortest possible time, relief supplies and technical or medical equipment are transported where needed, typically after natural disasters such as hurricanes, earthquakes, and volcanic eruptions.

Hamburg Süd maintains a long-term relationship to SOS Children's Villages, supporting their projects in different countries. Hamburg Süd also supports various initiatives in the fields of education and culture, including the United Buddy Bears exhibitions.

See also
 Containerisation
 Top intermodal container companies list

References

External links and references

 Official site
 Rudolf A. Oetker KG official site
 Aliança official Site
 

Shipping companies of Germany
Container shipping companies
Companies based in Hamburg
Dr. Oetker
1871 establishments in Germany
Companies established in 1871
2017 mergers and acquisitions
Maersk Line